Porth is a village and a community in the county borough of Rhondda Cynon Taff, Wales.

Porth may also refer to:

Places
 Porth, Cornwall, England
 Porth Island (also known as Trevelgue Head), headland in Cornwall, England
 Porth (crater), impact crater on Mars

People
 Andreas Porth (born 1984), German bobsledder
 Ari Porth (born 1970), American attorney, jurist, and politician
 Arthur Porth (1902–1993), American tax protester

Other uses
 AFC Porth, Welsh football team